Shamas or Chamas may refer to:

Gabbai, beadle or sexton

Surname
Herib Chamas, former football defender and coach
Sandra Shamas, Canadian comedic actress and writer
Samir Chamas, Lebanese actor, writer and journalist
Mohamad Chamas, Lebanese actor
Mohammed Shamas, Lebanese professional association football midfielder

See also
 Shama (disambiguation)
 Chamas

Surnames of Lebanese origin
Arabic-language surnames